The British Columbia Open, commonly known as the B. C. Open, was a golf tournament that was held in British Columbia, Canada. It was held annually from 1928 until 1993 except for during the Second World War and 1958, when it was cancelled due to the celebratory British Columbia Centennial Open.

The B. C. Open was a fixture on the Canadian Tour from the tours foundation, when it was the opening tournament in 1966, until 1993 when the British Columbia Professional Golfers Association decided to discontinue the event. Shortly afterwards, the BC TEL Pacific Open was founded as a replacement event on the tour.

At various times the B. C. Open was played over 36, 54 and 72 holes, often differing from one year to the next.

Winners

References

Former PGA Tour Canada events
Golf tournaments in British Columbia
Recurring sporting events established in 1928
Recurring sporting events disestablished in 1994